Vadaserikara is a village in Pathanamthitta district, in the state of Kerala, India. It is one of the 11 villages in Ranni and sits at the confluence of the Pamba and Kallar River.Nearest Railway Station Is Thiruvalla,Located At A Distance Of 34 km.

The village is located on the main trunk road to Sabarimala–the Pathanamthitta-Pampa Highway and is a stopover for pilgrims on the way to Sabarimala, the abode of Lord Ayyappa, a pilgrim centre that attracts millions of Ayyappa devotees. The Pathanamthitta-Seethathodu road also pass through Vadasserikkara.

Marthoma Christians and Orthodox form the majority of the population. The village has seen much growth since the 1990s. One of the biggest bridges in the district is at Benglavkadavu.

Demographics
 India census, Vadaserikara had a population of 22,577 with 11,080 males and 11,497 females.

Village council
The current president of the Vadaserikara Village Council or Gram Panchayat is Maniyar Radhamani.

Electricity supply
33kV Substation, Perunad

See also

 Angamoozhy
 Ranni
 Chittar
 Pathanamthitta

References

Villages in Pathanamthitta district